Bill Green (12 October 1914 – 2 December 1981) was an Australian rules footballer who played with Essendon in the Victorian Football League (VFL).

Notes

External links 
		

1914 births
1981 deaths
Australian rules footballers from Victoria (Australia)
Essendon Football Club players